Vivaldo Fernandes (born 10 June 1971) is an Angolan swimmer. He competed in the men's 100 metre breaststroke at the 1988 Summer Olympics.

References

External links
 

1971 births
Living people
Angolan male swimmers
Olympic swimmers of Angola
Swimmers at the 1988 Summer Olympics
Place of birth missing (living people)
Male breaststroke swimmers